CBC Quebec refers to:
CBVE-FM, CBC Radio One on 104.7 FM
CBVE-TV, CBC Television on channel 5, rebroadcaster of CBMT

SRC Quebec refers to:
CBV-FM, Première Chaîne on 106.3 FM
CBVX-FM, Espace musique on 95.3 FM
CBVT, Télévision de Radio-Canada on channel 11